The World Universities Debating Championship (WUDC) is the world's largest international debating tournament and one of the largest annual international student events. WUDC is held in the British Parliamentary format (involving four teams of two people in each debate).

Each year, the event is hosted by an institution selected by the World Universities Debating Council. The tournament is colloquially referred to as "Worlds" and the winners of the open competition acknowledged as the "world champions". The current world champions, David Africa and Tobi Leung, are from the Ateneo de Manila University. The university with the most world championships is the University of Sydney with eight victories.

History

Predecessor Tournaments
The Trans-Atlantic University Speech Association held tournaments in London (1976 and 1978) and at McGill University, Montreal, in 1977. Chicago was to hold a tournament in 1979 but this was postponed and then abandoned. A "World Debating Festival", sponsored by Honeywell was held in Sydney in 1978. The TAUSA event attracted mostly Northern Hemisphere tournaments, the Honeywell was largely Southern Hemisphere. The first competition was hosted in Glasgow and convened by debaters at the Glasgow University Union

Format
The championship is usually held in the days following the 25th of December, since many of the institutions attending from the Northern Hemisphere where the championship originated take vacations at this time. Although many countries that do not celebrate Christmas have become participants at the competition, the timing has remained the same. In most recent years, the nine preliminary rounds of the tournament have been held over three days from 29 to 31 December, with the elimination rounds being held on 2 January and the Grand Final on 3 January.

In recent years, the championship has varied from about 150 to 400 teams, depending on the capacity of the host institution. With judges and organisers, this involves 500 to 1,000 participants in all.

The competition involves nine preliminary rounds, which become "power-paired" as the tournament progresses, matching the strongest-performing teams against each other. Two teams form the "government" ("proposition" in the UK and North America) and two the "opposition" in each debate room. The process of scoring and pairing these teams is known as "tabbing". The scoring of teams is done by judges, most of whom are students or former students from the competing institutions, who return "ballots" with their scores to the adjudication team, led by a Chief Adjudicator who is assisted by one or more deputies. The deputies are not members of the host institution.

The nine preliminary rounds are followed by a "break" at which the teams proceeding to elimination rounds are announced. This is traditionally done on New Year's Eve, although this is subject to the timing of the tournament. In the current tournament format, the top 16 teams from the preliminary rounds proceed to the octofinal round. The teams ranked 17-48 also break into a partial double octofinal round, and the winning teams from this round join the teams ranked 1–16 in the octo-finals. While preliminary rounds are usually judged by three to five judges, the break rounds are judged by panels of five, semifinal judged by panels of seven and the finals by panels of nine.

Separate breaks are announced for the English-as-a-second language (ESL) and English-as-a-foreign language (EFL) team competitions, for the individual public speaking competition, and the "World Masters" tournament which is participated in by judges (most of whom are no longer students) representing the countries where they studied or of which they are citizens. In addition, a comedy competition is also open to all participants in Worlds.

Governance
The World Universities Debating Council consists of representatives of every country that competes at the World Universities Debating Championship. Each country selects one council delegate (the national debating association president, or selected from the participants at Worlds). The council is responsible for setting the rules and awarding the right to host the championships.

A Worlds Committee is elected to discuss issues during the year as Council only meets at the championships itself.  This Committee consists of a mix of elected officers and regional representatives from Africa, the Americas, Australia and New Zealand, Continental Europe and the Middle East, and the British Isles (referred to in debating as Islands of the North Atlantic thought more politically acceptable than British Isles).

The Council formerly operated not unlike the United Nations Security Council, with seven nations holding "charter member status" – the United States, Canada, England, Scotland, Ireland, Australia and New Zealand.  A two-thirds majority of these countries was required for changes to the championship's constitution, irrespective of how the general vote was tallied. However, as the number of non-charter nations attending grew, many fielding far more teams than some of the upper tier, and the championship began being hosted outside the Charter nations, pressure grew for the distinction to be eliminated.

The modern championship grants voting strength of between one and four votes per country, based on numbers of institutions attending recent championships. To allow for fluctuations in participation due to the financial difference in attending championships nearer or further in succeeding years, nations lose or gain their voting strength gradually.

The current chair of the council and the committee is Martha McKinney-Perry from the College Historical Society.

Notable controversies

Thailand WUDC 2020 
There was concern over the public debate of Hong Kong in the Open Grand Final motion. This led to walk-outs during the debate. After the live-stream, all recordings of the debate were deleted and the motion was erased from the tabulation software. Many participants had names removed from the public record retroactively once the competition was over. The organizing committee claims this was done to respect participants' privacy and denies pressure from any national body or representative.

Cape Town WUDC 2019 
Accusations of racism were made against members of the organising committee over treatment of participants. On the last day of the competition and just before the Open Grand Final was to begin, an organised protest took place and disrupted the event. Rather than delay the Open Grand Final, speakers and judges were relocated to an undisclosed room and the debate took place in private. This action was the subject of further controversy due to perceived undermining of an anti-racist cause.

Chennai WUDC 2014 
This tournament is notable for several controversies. This included "tracking registration payments, to issues with getting participants visas, allocating hotel rooms, picking participants safely up from the airport, toilet paper disappearing, insufficient food provision, and dangerous dirt bike socials". Discontent among judges who had been offered payment in return for participation resulted in strike threats, jeopardizing the 7th round of the tournament. There were also complaints from Pakistani participants of detention by Indian immigration authorities.

List of Tournaments

Trans-Atlantic University Speech Association

The "HONEYWELL" - World Debating Festival

List of notable alumni
 Christian Porter, Australian Member of Parliament
 Ted Cruz, U.S. Senator from Texas 
 Tara Zahra, U.S. historian
 Wu Meng Tan, Singaporean Member of Parliament 
 Vikram Nair, Singaporean Member of Parliament  
 Adam Spencer, Australian Comedian 
 Craig Reucassel, Australian Comedian 
 Daniel Mulino, Australian Member of Parliament 
 Stephanos Bibas, U.S. Circuit Court Judge 
 John Gastil, Professor of Political Science 
 David Celermajer, Australian Cardiologist 
 Kevin Sneader, global manager partner of McKinsey & Company
 Austan Goolsbee, former Chair of the U.S. Council of Economic Advisers
 Sally Rooney, Irish novelist 
 Michael Gove, UK Member of Parliament 
 Liam Fox, UK Member of Parliament 
 Chris Bishop, New Zealand Member of Parliament 
 Raybon Kan, New Zealand comedian  
 Gerald Butts, Canadian political consultant 
 Ian Hanomansing, Canadian journalist
 Richard Humphreys, Irish High Court Judge
 Syed Saddiq, Malaysian Member of Parliament 
 Ryan Knowles, Canadian comedian  
 Duncan Hamilton, Scottish Member of Parliament
 John Nicolson, Scottish Member of Parliament      
 John Wertheim, U.S. politician  
 Anna Donald, Australian epidemiologist
 Frank Luntz, U.S. political consultant
 Iain Morley, High Court Judge (Caribbean)
 Nicholas Mostyn, British High Court Judge 
 Rajeev Dhavan, Indian human rights activist 
 Dara Ó Briain, Irish comedian
 Peter van Onselen, Australian journalist 
 Simon Wolfson, British life peer 
 Kelly Rees, Australian Supreme Court judge 
 Stephen Gethins, British Member of Parliament
 Francis Greenslade, Australian comedic actor

See also
 Australasian Intervarsity Debating Championships
 European Universities Debating Championship
 North American Debating Championship
 United Asian Debating Championships
 World Universities Debating Championship in Spanish
Pan African Universities Debating Championship

References

External links
 Assumption Worlds 2008 website
 Cork Worlds website
 Koc University Worlds website
 De La Salle Worlds website
 Berlin Worlds 2013 website
 Chennai Worlds Website
 Malaysia Worlds 2015
 Thessaloniki Worlds 2016 website
 Korea Worlds 2021 website
 (Not) an exhaustive list of past WUDC debate motions

World Universities Debating Championship
Student events